José María Pemán y Pemartín (8 May 1897 in Cadiz – 19 July 1981, Ibid.) was a Spanish journalist, poet, playwright, novelist, essayist, and monarchist intellectual.

Biography
Originally a student of law, he entered the literary world with a series of poetic works inspired by his native Andalusia (De la vida sencilla, A la rueda, rueda, El barrio de Santa Cruz, and Las flores del bien). In the 1930s he became a journalist. In 1935 he joined the Real Academia de la Lengua, of which he was the director from 1939 to 1940 and 1944 to 1947.

Pemán often blurred literary genres, and developed a unique style that may be described as equidistant between classicism and modernism, not unfamiliar to readers of ABC and El Alcázar.

As a dramatist, he wrote historical-religious verse (El divino impaciente and Cuando las Cortes de Cádiz y Cisneros), plays based on Andalusian themes (Noche de levante en calma), and comical costume dramas (Julieta y Romeo and El viento sobre la tierra).

Pemán adapted many classical works (including Antigone, Hamlet, and Oedipus). He displayed his narrative skill in a series of novels and short stories (including Historia del fantasma y doña Juanita, Cuentos sin importancia, and La novela de San Martín). He was also a noted essayist.

In 1955 he received the Mariano de Cavia prize for journalism. In 1957, he won the March de Literatura prize. He was the personal advisor to the Count of Barcelona from 1969 until the title's dissolution. In 1981, a few months before his death he was named Knight of the Order of the Golden Fleece.

Pemán was one of the few prominent intellectuals to support Francisco Franco and the Falangist movement. This ensured his professional success during and after the Civil War, but damaged his international reputation.

Pemán wrote a set of unofficial, popular lyrics for the Marcha Real, which Franco had reinstated as Spain's national anthem in 1939 in its original form as a purely instrumental piece, despite some popular misapprehensions concerning the official status of Eduardo Marquina's lyrics. Despite never being published in the BOE (Official State Bulletin), Pemán's lyrics continued in use during the Transition period by a few who remained nostalgic for the Franco era.

Selected filmography
 Romeo and Juliet (1940)
 Lola Montes (1944)
 Madness for Love (1948)
 The Duchess of Benameji (1949)
 The Captain from Loyola (1949)
 Congress in Seville (1955)

External links
Arakis ISP 

1897 births
1981 deaths
People from Cádiz
Spanish Patriotic Union politicians
Renovación Española politicians
Members of the Congress of Deputies of the Second Spanish Republic
Members of the Cortes Españolas
Spanish people of the Spanish Civil War (National faction)
Spanish essayists
Spanish male novelists
Writers from Andalusia
Acción Española
Spanish male poets
Spanish male short story writers
Spanish short story writers
20th-century Spanish poets
20th-century male writers
20th-century Spanish novelists
Members of the Royal Spanish Academy
Knights of the Golden Fleece
Spanish nationalists
20th-century essayists
20th-century Spanish journalists